Eagle Bend is a city in Todd County, Minnesota, United States. The population was 535 at the 2010 census.

History
Eagle Bend was first settled in the early 1880s.  The first pioneers were Charles O'Dell, a merchant, and Marion Crider, a homesteader from eastern Kentucky. When O'Dell opened his general store, his first customer was Crider, who bought a pound of coffee. The townsite was purchased by a railroad executive, Benjamin F. Abbott, who wished to change the name of the town to Abbottsville; however, sensibility prevailed and the evocative name of Eagle Bend was retained. The post office was established in O'Dell's store in 1882, and the village was incorporated on January 21, 1890.

Geography
The village is located at a bend of Eagle Creek. Eagle Creek drains Harris Creek, and in turn flows into Long Prairie River.

Demographics

2010 census
As of the census of 2010, there were 535 people, 246 households, and 143 families living in the city. The racial makeup of the city was 97.2% White, 0.2% African American, 0.2% Native American, 0.6% Asian, 0.4% from other races, and 1.5% from two or more races. Hispanic or Latino of any race were 1.3% of the population.

There were 246 households, of which 24.4% had children under the age of 18 living with them, 43.5% were married couples living together, 11.0% had a female householder with no husband present, 3.7% had a male householder with no wife present, and 41.9% were non-families. 37.4% of all households were made up of individuals, and 21.5% had someone living alone who was 65 years of age or older. The average household size was 2.17 and the average family size was 2.87.

The median age in the city was 45.2 years. 22.2% of residents were under the age of 18; 6.5% were between the ages of 18 and 24; 21.4% were from 25 to 44; 26.1% were from 45 to 64; and 23.9% were 65 years of age or older. The gender makeup of the city was 48.6% male and 51.4% female.

2000 census
As of the census of 2000, there were 595 people, 268 households, and 165 families living in the city. The racial makeup of the city was 98.99% White, 0.67% Native American and 0.34% Asian. Hispanic or Latino of any race were 0.84% of the population.

There were 268 households, out of which 25.7% had children under the age of 18 living with them, 48.9% were married couples living together, 10.4% had a female householder with no husband present, and 38.4% were non-families. 34.3% of all households were made up of individuals, and 21.3% had someone living alone who was 65 years of age or older.  The average household size was 2.22 and the average family size was 2.82.

In the city, the population was spread out, with 23.7% under the age of 18, 8.4% from 18 to 24, 22.7% from 25 to 44, 21.3% from 45 to 64, and 23.9% who were 65 years of age or older.  The median age was 41 years. For every 100 females, there were 91.3 males.  For every 100 females age 18 and over, there were 90.0 males.

The median income for a household in the city was $27,308, and the median income for a family was $33,750. Males had a median income of $28,000 versus $21,250 for females. The per capita income for the city was $12,517.  About 9.1% of families and 14.9% of the population were below the poverty line, including 14.3% of those under age 18 and 17.6% of those age 65 or over.

References

Cities in Minnesota
Cities in Todd County, Minnesota